Fiescheralp (also known as Kühboden, literally "cows' floor") is a locality in the canton of Valais, Switzerland, situated above Fiesch at an elevation of  above sea level. It is the highest of the three car-free resorts lying on the southern slopes of the Eggishorn range, the two other being Riederalp and Bettmeralp to the west. Fiescheralp itself lies on a small plateau, approximately 200 metres above the tree line. Administratively, it belongs to the municipality of Fiesch, the border with the municipality of Lax running just west of the resort.

Like the two other car-free resorts, Fiescheralp can be reached by an aerial tramway.

In winter Fiescheralp is part of the ski area named Aletsch Arena.

References

External links

Official website

Car-free villages in Switzerland
Valais
Ski areas and resorts in Switzerland